Mari Christine Fitzduff (born March 15, 1947 in Dublin) is an Irish policy maker, writer and academic. She began her professional peacebuilding work in Northern Ireland in 1986 when she initiated conflict resolution and mediation programs at the University of Ulster, and Queen's University. In 1989,  she became a founder member of the Mediation Network which trained and supplied mediators for community and political mediations throughout Northern Ireland. In 1990 she  became the founding director of the Community Relations Council, set up to help develop and fund many of the peacebuilding initiatives in Northern Ireland. Subsequently she became the director of INCORE, a United Nations center at the University of Ulster dedicated to conflict policy related research. In 2004, she became the founding director of the international Masters of Conflict and Coexistence program at the Heller School in Brandeis University, Waltham, USA.

Career

Living in Northern Ireland during the conflict 1969-1998  Fitzduff set up the first courses in conflict resolution and mediation in both Queens University and Ulster University as well as being a founder of the Mediation Northern Ireland in 1988 which trains mediators for community and political conflicts.

From 1990-97 she was the Founding Director of the Community Relations Council, an independent body that was funded by both British and European funds. It helped develop and fund many of the conflict resolution initiatives in Northern Ireland.

From 1997-2003,  she held a chair in conflict Resolution at the University of Ulster where she was the Director of UNU/INCORE, an  International Conflict Research Institute which was a joint initiative of the United Nations University and the University of Ulster. It  conducts policy relevant international research on conflict issues around the world.

In 2004, she became the Founding Director of the Masters Conflict and Coexistence Programme at Brandeis University, which is an international program, for experienced professionals from conflict regions around the world.

Degrees
New University of Ulster, Ph.D Social Psychology
Queen's University, Belfast Diploma Management
University of Ulster, MA
University of Ulster, Diploma
Trinity College Dublin, Diploma Education
University College Dublin (UCD), BA

Quotes
"Nobody wants the final compromise to come too quickly ... because it's the end of the dream for both sides. It will have to be a perforated border as opposed to a united Ireland, and Unionists will have to abandon dreams of complete unity with the British motherland".

Publications. 

Our Brains at war: The Neuroscience of Conflict and Peacebuilding'. (2021) Oxford University Press.

Dialogue in divided societies: Skills for working with groups in conflict' (2020) Co-author with Sue Williams.

Why Irrational Politics appeals: Understanding the allure of Trump' (2017) Editor. Praeger Press.

Public Policy for Shared Societies. (2013) Editor  Palgrave MacMillan Press.

The Psychology of Resolving Global Conflicts: From War to Peace.  3 Vols. (2006) Co-editor with Chris Stout  Praeger.

Beyond Violence: Conflict Resolution Processes in Northern Ireland (2003)  UN University Press/Brookings.

Community Conflict Skills: Anti-sectarian work in Northern Ireland (1988) Community Relations Council.

References

External links
Israel.usembassy.gov
Beyondintractability.org
Heller.brandis.edu

1947 births
Place of birth missing (living people)
Living people
Academics of Ulster University
Brandeis University faculty
Writers from Belfast
British community activists
Women founders
Women educators from Northern Ireland
20th-century educators from Northern Ireland
21st-century educators from Northern Ireland
20th-century women educators
21st-century women educators